Annisse Nord is a town in the Gribskov Municipality in North Zealand, Denmark. It is located two kilometers north of Annisse, three kilometers south of Helsinge and 15 kilometers northwest of Hillerød.  As of 2022, it has a population of 1,540.

The  school is located in the town.

References 

Cities and towns in the Capital Region of Denmark
Gribskov Municipality